The Satellite Award for Best DVD Extras was an award given by the International Press Academy from 2003 to 2010 and in 2012.

Winners and nominees

References

DVD Extras